The Women's 500m Time Trial was one of the 6 women's events at the 2006 UCI Track Cycling World Championships, held in Bordeaux, France.

17 Cyclists from 13 countries participated in the contest. The Final was held on April 13 at 18:35.

World record

Final

References

Women's 500 m time trial
UCI Track Cycling World Championships – Women's 500 m time trial